This is a list of fictional non-human primates in video games and this list is a subsidiary to the list of fictional primates.

See also
List of fictional primates

Video games
Primates